Séamus O'Farrell (died 9 December 1973) was an Irish independent politician and journalist. He was a member of Seanad Éireann from 1948 to 1951. He was nominated by the Taoiseach to the 6th Seanad in 1948. He lost his seat the 1951 Seanad election.

References

Year of birth missing
1973 deaths
Independent members of Seanad Éireann
Members of the 6th Seanad
Nominated members of Seanad Éireann